Air Chief Marshal Sir Rex David Roe,  (4 May 1925 – 3 November 2002) was a senior Royal Air Force commander.

RAF career
Educated at the City of London School and the University of London, Roe joined the Royal Air Force in 1943 during the Second World War. He was appointed Officer Commanding No. 204 Squadron in 1960 and became Senior Air Staff Officer at Headquarters No. 18 Group in 1964. He went on to be Station Commander at RAF Syerston in 1967, Director of RAF Flying Training in 1969 and Deputy Controller, Aircraft at the MoD Procurement Executive in 1972. After that he was made Senior Air Staff Officer at Headquarters Near East Air Force in 1974. He was made Air Officer Commanding-in-Chief at RAF Training Command in January 1976 and personally took delivery of the new Hawk in November of that year flying it himself into RAF Valley. His last appointments were as Air Officer Commanding-in-Chief at RAF Support Command in 1977 and as Air Member for Supply and Organisation in 1978 before he retired in 1981.

References

|-

|-

1925 births
2002 deaths
People educated at the City of London School
Alumni of the University of London
Royal Air Force air marshals
Knights Grand Cross of the Order of the Bath
Recipients of the Air Force Cross (United Kingdom)
Recipients of the Commendation for Valuable Service in the Air